STARGATE—Spacecraft Tracking and Astronomical Research into Gigahertz Astrophysical Transient Emission—is a radio-frequency (RF) technology facility currently under development in south Texas.

The facility is intended to provide students and faculty access to RF technologies widely used in spaceflight operations, and will include satellite and spacecraft tracking.

History
The Spacecraft Tracking and Astronomical Research into Gigahertz Astrophysical Transient Emission facility was proposed in 2012 by Fredrick (Rick) Jenet, director of the Center for Advanced Radio Astronomy (CARA) and  an associate professor of physics and astronomy at the University of Texas-Brownsville.  Initial funding included  in seed money provided by the Greater Brownsville Incentives Corporation in October 2012, as part of a package to increase the likelihood of attracting SpaceX to build a launch site in the area.

The land will be used for the STARGATE project including the construction of a  tracking center.

Construction bids for a dual-channel fiber optic link between UT Brownsville and the STARGATE/SpaceX sites at Boca Chica went out in early March 2015.

In mid-2015, the University of Texas at Brownsville merged with another university to become the University of Texas Rio Grande Valley.  STARGATE contracts and administration thus moved to the new university administrative structure.

Two 9 m (30 ft) S-band tracking station antennas from decommissioned Merritt Island Spaceflight Tracking and Data Network station were refurbished and installed at the site in 2016–2017.

Funding 

  from the Texas Emerging Technology Fund
  from the University of Texas System
  from the US Economic Development Administration
  from the Greater Brownsville Incentives Corporation.

Further incentives were presented to SpaceX in September 2013 when the University of Texas System proposed that SpaceX partner with UT Brownsville's Center for Advanced Radio Astronomy in building and operating STARGATE.

STARGATE received a  grant from the US Economic Development Administration in October 2014.

Early in 2015, "the Brownsville Economic Development Council donated property at Boca Chica to the UT system for the STARGATE Technology Park."  The dollar value of the in-kind funding for the property was not released.

Technology
, STARGATE intends to develop new devices and new algorithms for tracking spacecraft, and intends to commercialize those technologies.

STARGATE plans to "test and commercialize a new phased-array antenna system that will replace fixed satellite-dish tracking communication systems."

See also
European Space Tracking
ISRO Telemetry, Tracking and Command Network
NASA Deep Space Network
Near Earth Network
Space Network
Merritt Island Spaceflight Tracking and Data Network station
Starlink – a satellite constellation that provides both backhaul and direct internet service, and which utilizes phased-array antenna technology for the terrestrial transceivers

References

External links 
 STARGATE webpage, at UT Brownsville.
 Stargate 1: Rocket Science and the RGV, following inaugural STARGATE Talk, May 2015.
 UTRGV’s STARGATE Academy, July 2016.
 Two large satellite-tracking ground stations antennas to Boca Chica, July 2016.

University of Texas Rio Grande Valley
Astronomical observatories in Texas
Radio astronomy
University of Texas at Brownsville